Matija Cvek (born 9 March 1993) is a Croatian singer and songwriter. He rose to fame by participating in HRT's show A strana. He first gained public attention in 2018 when he released his song "Visine". Cvek's first studio album, Izbirljivo i slučajno (2021), debuted atop the Croatian Albums Chart.

Career
Cvek performed at the Eurovision Song Contest 2017 as a backing vocalist for Jacques Houdek's song "My Friend". After his appearance at the Eurovisiong Song Contest he participating regularly at various festivals and gigs. In June 2018, Cvek released his major label debut single "Visine". Cvek released his debut studio album Izbirljivo i slučajno on 16 April 2021 and debuted atop the Croatian Top of the Shops albums chart. In early 2022, a collaboration with Croatian singer Eni Jurišić titled "Trebaš li me" was released. The track reached number one on the HR Top 40 becoming Cvek's first chart topper. At the 29th Annual Porin Awards, Cvek took home two awards: the award for Best Pop Album and the award for Best Male Vocal Performance. At the 2023 edition of the Cesarica Awards, Cvek won the Song of The Year award with "Trebaš li me". The song received two additional Songs of The Year awards at the 2023 editions of Zlatni Studio and Top.HR Music Awards, respectively.

Personal life
Cvek was in a relationship with Croatian singer-songwriter Nika Turković.

Discography

Studio albums

Live albums

Singles

Awards and nominations

References

External links
 

Living people
1993 births
Croatian pop singers
Musicians from Zagreb
21st-century Croatian male singers